Iantha is an unincorporated community in Barton County, Missouri.  It is located six miles west of Lamar.

Demographics

History
Iantha was founded in 1881. The community most likely was named after an early settler. A post office called Iantha was established in 1881, and remained in operation until 1885.

Notable person
 Earle D. Baker (1888-1987), Los Angeles City Council member, born in Iantha

References

Unincorporated communities in Barton County, Missouri
Unincorporated communities in Missouri